The Eureka Spurs are several rock spurs exposed along the east side of the head of Mariner Glacier,  southwest of Mount McCarthy, in Victoria Land. They were so named, after the ancient Greek word eureka, by the Victoria University of Wellington Antarctic Expedition field party to Evans Neve, 1971–72, on the occasion of fossil discoveries made in the area.

References 

Ridges of Victoria Land
Borchgrevink Coast